Bartleby is a 1976 French drama film directed by Maurice Ronet and starring Michael Lonsdale, Maxence Mailfort and Maurice Biraud. It is an adaptation of the short story "Bartleby, the Scrivener" by Herman Melville.

Plot
Bartleby is a loner who gets hired as a clerk when a lawyer is desperate to find a reliable assistant. Unfortunately Bartleby isn't happy with his work. He falls into passivity and depression. When the law office moves, Bartleby prefers to stay in the abandoned rooms. People get fascinated by his strange behaviour.

Cast
 Michael Lonsdale as the bailiff
 Maxence Mailfort as Bartleby
 Maurice Biraud as Dindon
 Dominique Zardi as Cisaille
 Jacques Fontanelle as Gingembre
 Hubert Deschamps as the manager
 Albert Michel as the prison cook
 Philippe Brigaud as the vice director of the prison
 Michel Fortin as the taxi driver
 Henri Attal as the prison guard
 Maurice Ronet as the narrator

Release
Bartleby was released in France in 1978.

References

External links

1976 films
French drama films
1976 drama films
1970s French-language films
Films based on works by Herman Melville
Films directed by Maurice Ronet
1970s French films